Dioszegia is a genus of fungi in the family Bulleribasidiaceae. The genus, comprising anamorphic forms, has a widespread distribution, and contains around 16 species.

References

External links

Tremellomycetes